Lindsay Parker (born March 30, 1980) is an American former actress.

Career 
Parker started her career as Little Girl on an episode of MacGyver. She appeared in the film Shocker three years later, and played Kirstie Alley's daughter Melissa in the 1987 film Infidelity. She provided the voice of Corey in Cartoon All-Stars to the Rescue and also played Carrie in the 1987 film Flowers in the Attic. She remained active in acting up until 2007.

In April 2014, Parker published her first children's book, Fiona Von Finnigan - Fairy Tale Fixer, written and illustrated entirely by her. Her father is Andy Parker, the drummer of the English heavy rock band, UFO.

References

External links

1980 births
Living people
20th-century American actresses
21st-century American actresses
Actresses from Los Angeles
American child actresses
American film actresses
American people of English descent
American television actresses